Song Jin-hyung (born 13 August 1987) is a South Korean football player who plays as a midfielder.

Club career
Song started his professional career at Brazilian club Internacional, before moving back to his homeland South Korea to play for one of the powerhouses of Korean and Asian football FC Seoul.

After a stint with FC Seoul, Song went to Australia in the hope of securing an A-League contract. After trialling with Newcastle United Jets, he impressed coach Gary van Egmond enough to earn a contract with the club. Newcastle's management immediately secured his visa and arranged his contract, a two-year deal signed on 18 January 2008.

Song made his debut for the club in the away leg of their semi-final clash with rivals, Central Coast Mariners, which Newcastle lost 3–0. He played a starring role in their subsequent grand final victory over Central Coast, constantly proving a menacing threat for the Mariners' defence. Song's first senior career goal came on 19 December 2008 against Melbourne Victory. Song threaded through a sublime ball through to Jets' striker Joel Griffiths, who squared the ball back to Song to fire into the bottom corner of the net, securing three points for the Jets.

Song made it clear that his preference was to play in Europe, although he didn't ruled out the possibility of re-signing with the Jets. On 29 March 2010, it was announced that he would trial at PSV Eindhoven, the former club of fellow Koreans Park Ji-Sung and Lee Young-Pyo.

On 28 June 2010 the 22-year-old Korean attacking midfielder signed a two-year contract with Tours FC of the French Ligue 2.

In January 2012, he returned to South Korea from the French side for K-League outfit Jeju United. On 31 January 2012, Song signed a three-year contract with Jeju on a free transfer.

In September 2016, he transferred to Al-Sharjah SCC.

International career
Song played for South Korea U-20 at the 2006 AFC Youth Championship and at the subsequent 2007 FIFA U-20 World Cup. He scored two goals against Australia to knock them out of the 2006 AFC Youth Championship.

Career statistics

Club

Honours
FC Seoul
 Korean League Cup: 2006

Newcastle Jets
 A-League Championship: 2007–2008

References

External links

 Song Jin-hyung – National Team Stats at KFA 
 
 

1987 births
Living people
Footballers from Seoul
Association football midfielders
South Korean footballers
South Korea under-20 international footballers
South Korea international footballers
FC Seoul players
Newcastle Jets FC players
Tours FC players
Jeju United FC players
Sharjah FC players
K League 1 players
A-League Men players
Ligue 2 players
UAE Pro League players
South Korean expatriate footballers
South Korean expatriate sportspeople in Brazil
South Korean expatriate sportspeople in Australia
South Korean expatriate sportspeople in France
South Korean expatriate sportspeople in the United Arab Emirates
Expatriate footballers in Brazil
Expatriate soccer players in Australia
Expatriate footballers in France
Expatriate footballers in the United Arab Emirates